Moana (also known as Vaiana or Oceania in some markets) is a 2016 American computer-animated musical action-adventure fantasy film produced by Walt Disney Animation Studios and released by Walt Disney Pictures. The 56th Disney animated feature film, it was directed by John Musker and Ron Clements, co-directed by Chris Williams and Don Hall, and produced by Osnat Shurer, from a screenplay written by Jared Bush, and a story by Clements, Musker, Williams, Hall, Pamela Ribon, and the writing team of Aaron and Jordan Kandell.

The film introduces Auliʻi Cravalho as the voice of Moana and also features the ensemble voices of Dwayne Johnson, Rachel House, Temuera Morrison, Jemaine Clement, Nicole Scherzinger, and Alan Tudyk. It features original songs written by Lin-Manuel Miranda, Opetaia Foa'i, and Mark Mancina, and an orchestral score also composed by Mancina. Set in ancient Polynesia, the film tells the story of Moana, the strong-willed daughter of a chief of a coastal village, who is chosen by the ocean itself to reunite a mystical relic with the goddess Te Fiti. When a blight strikes her island, Moana sets sail in search of Maui, a legendary demigod, in the hope of returning the relic to Te Fiti and saving her people. The plot is original, but takes inspiration from Polynesian myths.

Moana premiered during the AFI Fest at the El Capitan Theatre in Los Angeles on November 14, 2016, and was released theatrically in the United States on November 23. The film received positive reviews from critics, who particularly praised its animation, music, and vocal performances. The film went on to gross over $645 million worldwide. Along with Zootopia, it marked the first time since 2002 that Walt Disney Animation Studios released two feature films in the same year, after Lilo & Stitch and Treasure Planet. At the 89th Academy Awards, the film received two nominations for Best Animated Feature and Best Original Song ("How Far I'll Go").

Plot

On the Polynesian island of Motunui, the inhabitants worshipped the goddess of nature, Te Fiti (a living island who brought life to the ocean long ago using a pounamu stone as her heart and the source of her power). Maui, the trickster, shape-shifting demigod of the wind and sea and master of sailing, stole the heart to give humanity the power of creation. This caused Te Fiti to disintegrate, and Maui was attacked offshore by Te Kā, a volcanic demon. He lost both the heart and his magical giant fishhook to the depths of the sea.

A thousand years later, the ocean chooses Moana, daughter of Motunui's chief Tui, to return the heart to Te Fiti. Tui and Sina, Moana's father and mother, try to keep her away from the ocean to prepare her to become the island's chief. Sixteen years later, a blight strikes the island, killing vegetation and shrinking the fish catch. Moana suggests going beyond the island's reef with her pet pig, Pua, to find more fish and find out what is happening, but Tui forbids it. Moana tries conquering the reef but is overpowered by the tides and shipwrecked back to Motunui. That afternoon, Moana's grandmother, Tala, shows her a secret cave of ships, revealing that their people were voyagers until Maui stole Te Fiti's heart; the ocean was no longer safe without it. Tala explains that Te Kā's darkness is poisoning the island, but can be cured if Moana finds Maui and has him restore the heart of Te Fiti. Having been given the heart of Te Fiti by the ocean, Tala gives it to Moana. Tala later falls ill and, on her deathbed, tells Moana that she must depart to find Maui.

Moana sets sail on a camakau from the cavern along with her dimwitted pet rooster, Heihei, who has stowed away on it. They are caught in a typhoon and shipwrecked on an island where she finds Maui, who boasts about his achievements. She demands that Maui return the heart, but he refuses and traps her in a cave before leaving on Moana’s camakau. She escapes and confronts Maui, who reluctantly lets her on the camakau. They are attacked by Kakamora—coconut pirates—who seek the heart, but Moana and Maui outwit them. Moana realizes Maui is no longer a hero since he stole the heart and cursed the world, and convinces him to redeem himself by returning the heart. Maui first needs to retrieve his magical fishhook in Lalotai, the Realm of Monsters, from Tamatoa, a giant coconut crab. While Moana distracts Tamatoa, Maui retrieves his hook, only to find himself unable to control his shape-shifting. He is overpowered by Tamatoa, but Moana's quick thinking allows them to escape with the hook. Maui reveals that his first tattoo was earned when his mortal parents abandoned him as an infant, and the gods, taking pity on him, granted him his powers. After reassurance from Moana, Maui teaches her the art of way-finding, regaining control of his powers, and the two grow closer.

They arrive at Te Fiti's island, only to be attacked by Te Kā. Moana refuses to turn back, resulting in Maui's hook being badly damaged. Unwilling to lose his hook in another confrontation with Te Kā, Maui abandons a tearful Moana, who asks the ocean to find someone else to restore the heart and loses hope. The ocean obliges and takes the heart, but Tala's spirit appears, inspiring Moana to find her true calling. She retrieves the heart and sails back to confront Te Kā. Maui returns, having had a change of heart, and buys Moana time to reach Te Fiti by fighting Te Kā, destroying his hook in the process. Upon being unable to find Te Fiti, Moana realizes Te Kā is Te Fiti, corrupted without her heart. The ocean clears a path for Moana, allowing her to return the heart to Te Fiti, who heals the ocean and islands of the blight. Maui apologizes to Te Fiti, who fixes his hook and decorates Moana's boat with flowers before falling into a deep sleep and becoming an island. Moana bids farewell to Maui and Te Fiti, returning home where she reunites with her parents. She takes up her role as chief and wayfinder, leading her people as they resume voyaging with Maui flying over them in Hawk form.

Cast

 Auliʻi Cravalho as Moana, the curious daughter of village chief Tui and his wife Sina, who is chosen by the ocean to restore the heart of Te Fiti
 Cravalho reprised her role in the Hawaiian-language version of the movie.
 Louise Bush as a younger Moana
 Dwayne Johnson as Maui, a legendary strong-willed yet easily annoyed shapeshifting demigod who sets off with Moana on her journey
 Rachel House as Tala, Tui's mother and Moana's paternal grandmother. Like Moana, Tala shares a passion for the ocean and the two have a very deep bond.
 House reprised her role in the Māori-language version of the movie.
 Temuera Morrison as Tui, Moana's overprotective father, Sina’s husband, and Tala's son. He is chief of Motunui Island.
 Morrison reprised his role in the Māori-language version of the movie.
 Christopher Jackson as Tui's singing voice
 Jemaine Clement as Tamatoa, a giant, villainous, treasure-hoarding coconut crab from Lalotai, the Realm of Monsters
 Clement reprised his role in the Māori-language version of the movie.
 Nicole Scherzinger as Sina, Moana's mother, Tui's wife, and Chieftess of Motunui.
 Scherzinger also reprised her role in the Hawaiian-language version of the movie.
 Alan Tudyk as Heihei, Moana's pet rooster
 Tudyk also voices Villager No. 3, an old man who suggests cooking Heihei
 Oscar Kightley as a fisherman
 Troy Polamalu as Villager No. 1
 Puanani Cravalho (Auliʻi's mother) as Villager No. 2

Production

Development

After directing The Princess and the Frog (2009), Clements and Musker started working on an adaptation of Terry Pratchett's Mort, but problems with acquiring the necessary film rights prevented them from continuing with that project. To avoid a recurrence of that issue, they pitched three original ideas. The genesis of one of those ideas (the one that was ultimately green-lit) occurred in 2011, when Musker began reading up on Polynesian mythology, and learned of the heroic exploits of the demigod Māui. Intrigued with the rich culture of Polynesia, he felt it would be a suitable subject for an animated film. Shortly thereafter, Musker and Clements wrote a treatment and pitched it to John Lasseter, who recommended that both of them should go on research trips. Accordingly, in 2012, Clements and Musker went on research trips to Fiji, Samoa, and Tahiti to meet the people of the South Pacific Ocean and learn about their culture. At first, they had planned to make the film entirely about Maui, but their initial research trips inspired Clements to pitch a new idea focused on the young daughter of a chief.

Clements and Musker were fascinated to learn during their research that the people of Polynesia abruptly stopped making long-distance voyages about three thousand years ago. Polynesian navigational traditions had long predated those of European explorers, beginning around 300 CE. Native people of the Pacific possessed knowledge of the world and their place in it prior to the incursion of foreigners. For example, Kānaka Maoli (Native Hawaiians) were well aware of the existence of far away islands, had names for these places, and were interested in exploring them to benefit their societies. This voyaging heritage was made possible by a geographical knowledge system based on individual perspective rather than the European cardinal direction system. The reasons for the halt of this voyaging tradition remain unknown, but scholars have offered climate change and resulting shifts in ocean currents and wind patterns as one possible explanation. Native peoples of the Pacific resumed voyaging again a thousand years later. Clements and Musker set the film at that point in time, about two thousand years ago, on a fictional island in the central Pacific Ocean, which drew inspiration from elements of the real-life island nations of Fiji, Samoa, and Tonga.

Over the five years it took to develop and produce the film, Clements and Musker recruited experts from across the South Pacific to form an Oceanic Story Trust, who consulted on the film's cultural accuracy and sensitivity as the story evolved through nine versions. The Trust responded negatively, for example, to a depiction of Maui as bald, and to a proposed scene in which Moana threw a tantrum by throwing coconuts. In response, Maui was reworked with long hair and the coconut scene was scrapped.

During the 2015 D23 Expo's panel for Disney's slate of upcoming animated films, Moana's last name was given as "Waialiki", but that name was not retained in the final film.

Writing
Taika Waititi wrote the initial screenplay, but went home to New Zealand in 2012 to focus on his newborn first child and What We Do in the Shadows. Years later, Waititi joked that all that was left of his original draft was "EXT: OCEAN – DAY". The first draft focused on Moana as the sole daughter in a family with "five or six brothers", in which gender played into the story. However, the brothers and gender-based theme were deleted from the story, as the directors thought Moana's journey should be about finding herself. A subsequent draft presented Moana's father as the one who wanted to resume navigation, but it was rewritten to have him oppose navigation so he would not overshadow Moana. Instead, Pamela Ribon came up with the idea of a grandmother character for the film, who would serve as a mentor linking Moana to ancient traditions. Another version focused on Moana rescuing her father, who had been lost at sea. The film's story changed drastically during the development phase (which happens with most Disney films), and that idea ultimately survived only as a subtle element of the father's backstory.

Te Kā was referred to in early drafts of the film as Te Pō, a reference to the Māori goddess Hine-nui-te-pō, who was originally the life-giving goddess Hine-tītama, but became the goddess of death upon discovering that her husband, the god Tāne, was also her father. Māui set out to defeat her in order to bring immortality to humans, but failed and was himself killed.

Aaron and Jordan Kandell joined the project during a critical period to help deepen the emotional story architecture of the film. They are credited with developing the core relationship between Moana and Maui, the prologue, the Cave of the Wayfinders, the Kakamora, and the collector crab Tamatoa (played by Jemaine Clement). Jared Bush received sole credit as the writer of the final version of the screenplay.

Several major story problems were identified in 2015 after the film had already transitioned from development into production, but computer-generated films tend to have much shorter production schedules and much larger animation teams (in this case, about 90 animators) than traditionally animated films. Since Clements and Musker were already working 12-hour days (and Saturdays) directing such a large team of animators, Don Hall and Chris Williams (who had just finished directing Big Hero 6) came on board as co-directors to help fix the film's story issues. The scene in which Maui and Moana encounter the Kakamora is an intentional homage to Mad Max: Fury Road.

Casting

After the filmmakers sat through auditions of hundreds of candidates from across the Pacific, 14-year-old high school freshman Auliʻi Cravalho was cast as the lead character Moana. At that point in time, the design of Moana's face and personality was already complete, and Cravalho's obvious physical resemblance to her character was simply a coincidence. During animation production, Disney animators were able to integrate some of Cravalho's mannerisms into Moana's behavior as depicted onscreen.

The majority of the film's cast members are of Polynesian descent: Auliʻi Cravalho (Moana) and Nicole Scherzinger (Sina, Moana's mother) were born in Hawaii and are of Native Hawaiian heritage; Dwayne Johnson (Maui), Oscar Kightley (Fisherman), and Troy Polamalu (Villager No. 1) are of Samoan heritage; and New Zealand-born Rachel House (Tala, Moana's grandmother), Temuera Morrison (Tui, Moana's father), and Jemaine Clement (Tamatoa) are of Māori heritage.

Animation
Moana is Clements and Musker's first fully computer-animated film. One of the reasons for using computer animation was that the environment, including the ocean, benefited much more from the use of CGI as opposed to traditional animation. The filmmakers have also suggested that three-dimensional computer animation is well-suited to the "beautiful sculpturing" of the faces of the people of the South Pacific. Eric Goldberg worked on the hand-drawn animation used to depict Maui's sentient tattoos. During early development, the filmmakers considered the possibility of making the film with hand-drawn traditional animation, but only a few early animation tests were made in that style. In the final cut, only Maui's tattoos are hand-drawn.

Moana was produced in makeshift quarters in a giant warehouse in North Hollywood (together with Zootopia), while Disney Animation's headquarters building in Burbank was being renovated. Musker observed that Moana was similar in that respect to The Little Mermaid, which was produced in a warehouse in Glendale. Production wrapped on October 20, 2016.

Music and soundtrack

The film's soundtrack was released by Walt Disney Records on November 18, 2016. The songs were written by Opetaia Foa'i, Mark Mancina, who previously collaborated with the studio on Tarzan and Brother Bear, and Lin-Manuel Miranda, while the score was written by Mancina. The lyrics are in English, Samoan, and the Tokelauan language. The soundtrack peaked at number two on the Billboard 200.

Localization

In many European countries, the name of the titular character, Moana, was changed to Vaiana due to a trademark conflict. The film was released in those countries to bear the alternative name in the title. In Italy, the film was released with the title Oceania: media outlets speculated that the name change was to avoid confusion with Italian pornographic actress Moana Pozzi, and Disney Italy's head of theatrical marketing, Davide Romani, acknowledged they were "thinking about the issue" at a meeting of Italian exhibitors in 2015.

Following the success brought by international productions of Disney's Frozen, which led to the release of a complete set album which included all the official versions of "Let It Go" released at the time, Disney decided to produce a special Tahitian dubbing for the movie. On October 25, 2016, at a press conference in Papeete, it was announced that the film will be the first motion picture to be fully dubbed in the Tahitian language. This marks the second time Disney has released a special dubbing dedicated to the culture which inspired the film: the first case was The Lion King (1994), for which the directors travelled to South Africa to cast voice actors for a Zulu-dubbed version. The Tahitian dubbing was made available in schools and institutions, but never for the public to purchase.

In June 2017, a Māori-language dubbing of the movie was announced, premiering in Auckland on September 11, with 30 theatres screening it for free as part of Māori Language Week. Rachel House, Jemaine Clement, Temuera Morrison, and Oscar Kightley reprised their respective roles in this version, directed by Rachel House herself. In contrast to the Tahitian dubbing, the Māori version was made available for purchase in Australia and New Zealand, and the soundtrack was uploaded on Disney's official Vevo channel.

In November 2017, a Hawaiian-language (ʻŌlelo Hawaiʻi) dubbing was announced to be under way, with Aulii Cravalho reprising her role as Moana and Nicole Scherzinger reprising the role of Sina. The movie premiered on June 10, 2018, and like the Tahitian dubbing, was later distributed for free to schools in Hawaii. It was never released for sale in home media form.

Release
On October 20, 2014, Walt Disney Pictures announced that it would be releasing the film in late 2016, and hinted that it might be the November 23, 2016, release window previously announced by the studio in March 2014 for a then-untitled film. In November 2014, Disney confirmed that it would be releasing the film on November 23, 2016. The film is accompanied by the short film Inner Workings. The film's world premiere was held at the El Capitan Theatre in Los Angeles on November 14, 2016.

On January 27, 2017, a sing-along version of Moana was released in more than 2,000 theaters in the United States, featuring on-screen lyrics.

Marketing

On October 15, 2016, Hawaiian Airlines unveiled their Moana-themed livery for three of their Airbus A330-200 fleet. Disney initiating a partnership with Hawaiian Airlines to promote the film has been perceived as having the motive of fetishizing Polynesian island nations as exotic vacation spots, the people and culture of which exist only to entertain foreign audiences, as well as Auliʻi Cravalho speaking with The New York Times in an interview sharing travel tips for visitors to Hawaii. Critiques of these promotional tactics focus on how adverse effects of tourism have devastated native communities in the Pacific, resulting in environmental degradation and poverty.

A Maui "skin suit" costume made to tie in with the film was pulled by Disney from its online store following complaints about it being culturally insensitive and for appearing to promote brownface.

There are currently meet-and-greets with Moana at Disneyland, Walt Disney World, Disneyland Paris, and at Aulani, a Disney Resort and Spa. At the parks, she is located in Adventureland and is occasionally joined by Maui.

At Hong Kong Disneyland, there is a stage show called Moana's Village Festival, which opened in 2018.

Home media
Moana was released by Walt Disney Studios Home Entertainment on Blu-ray (2D and 3D) and DVD in the United States on March 7, 2017, with a digital release on February 21, 2017. The releases include the short film Inner Workings. The Blu-ray release also introduces a short film featuring Maui and Moana titled Gone Fishing. The film sold 4.4 million units and made a revenue of $116.3 million from home video sales, making it the best-selling film of 2017. Moana was also released on the streaming service Disney+ on its launch date November 12, 2019. A sing-along version of the film was released on Disney+ July 22, 2022.

Reception

Box office
Moana grossed $248.7 million in the U.S. and Canada, and $442.1 million in other countries, for a worldwide total of $690.8 million. On January 22 and March 16, 2017, respectively, the film reached the $500 million and $600 million marks, becoming the fourth consecutive Walt Disney Animation Studios film to reach both milestones after Frozen (2013), Big Hero 6 (2014), and Zootopia (2016). Although Disney has not disclosed the film's production budget, most of its animated films cost around $150 million. Deadline Hollywood calculated the net profit of the film to be $121.3 million, when factoring together all expenses and revenues for the film, making it the 12th-most profitable release of 2016.

North America
In the United States, Moana was released during the Thanksgiving weekend. The film played in 3,875 theaters of which a majority of them (80%) screened it in 3D. It also played in 50 premium large-format screens and more than 400 D-Box screens. It was projected to take in around $50 million in three days, with $75–85 million in five days (some estimates going as high as $90 million). Deadline.com said the numbers were good for the original Disney film and marked a great rebound for the company in the wake of Pixar's The Good Dinosaur the previous year, which had made $55 million over five days off a production budget of $175–200 million.

Moana made $2.6 million from Tuesday paid previews which began at 7 pm, the highest ever for a Walt Disney Animation Studios film and for a non-Pixar Disney animated film. On its opening day, it made $15.5 million, a new record for a Walt Disney Animation Studios film opening on Wednesday (breaking Frozens record) and the biggest opening day ever for a film released on pre-Thanksgiving Day. On Thanksgiving Day, it earned $9.9 million, a decrease of 36% from its previous day. On Black Friday—the highest-grossing day of the Thanksgiving stretch—it made $21.8 million, a 127% increase from the day before. Through Sunday, the film posted a three-day opening weekend worth $56.6 million over its Friday-to-Sunday debut and $82.1 million from Wednesday to Sunday, the third biggest three-day Thanksgiving opening (behind Frozen and Toy Story 2) and the second-biggest five-day Thanksgiving opening (behind Frozen), dethroning Fantastic Beasts and Where to Find Them off the top spot. Among all films that did not necessarily open in this weekend but may have played, Moana ranks sixth among three-day weekends and fifth among five-day weekends.

The film's opening was considered to be another animated success for the studio after Zootopia and Pixar's Finding Dory posted huge openings, respectively, the same year in March and June.

In its second weekend, the film dropped by about 50% for a total of $28.3 million, a smaller drop than Toy Story 2, Frozen, Tangled, and The Good Dinosaur. The film managed to top the box office for its third weekend, despite competition from newcomers and holdovers, earning $18.5 million while falling by 34%. It became the sixth film of 2016 to top the box office three times, following Deadpool, Zootopia, The Jungle Book, Finding Dory, and Suicide Squad. The film was overtaken by Disney's own Rogue One: A Star Wars Story in its fourth weekend, despite only a marginal decline.

It fell to number six in its fifth weekend, due to competition from four new releases—Sing, Passengers, Why Him?, and Assassin's Creed—despite a small drop again; it grossed $2.9 million on Christmas Day. On the holiday week of December 23–29, the film finished at number four with a gross of $26 million, which was 14% up from the previous week, despite losing over 300 theaters. It finished at number four in its sixth weekend, going up 42% and 97%, respectively, during the three-day and four-day weekends; it grossed $3.6 million on New Year's Day.

It fell outside the top ten in its eighth weekend (which included Martin Luther King Jr. Day), dropping 33% and 4%, respectively, during the three-day and four-day weekends.

Outside North America
Internationally, the film earned $17.2 million in its first weekend from 12 markets, the bulk of which came from China. In its second weekend, the film expanded to a total of 30 markets, adding an additional $33.7 million.

In China, the film had a November 25 opening day with $1.9 million from 38,000 screenings. However, it enjoyed a big weekend bump on Saturday—even though its screens dipped—and Sunday. In total, it scored an opening weekend of $12.3 million, the second best for a Disney animated title, behind only Zootopia. It was No. 2 behind Fantastic Beasts and Where to Find Them. Strong social media numbers showed among the highest the studio has seen there, similar to how Zootopia started off slow and later became a blockbuster phenomenon. The film slipped 55% in its second weekend, earning $5.8 million, and $21.8 in total in China. It would eventually earn a total of $32.7 million in China.

It had similar successful number-one debuts in France, Russia, Mexico and Spain. The film also saw success in Belgium, the Netherlands and French-speaking Switzerland. In the United Kingdom and Ireland, the film faced competition from Fantastic Beasts—which was playing in its third weekend—and as a result, it posted a low opening of only £2.2 million ($2.8 million).

The biggest earning markets to date have been Japan ($45.9 million), followed by France ($35.5 million), China ($32.8 million), the UK ($25.3 million), Brazil ($22.9 million), Australia ($19 million), Germany ($17 million), Italy ($15.9 million), and South Korea ($15.5 million).

Critical response
The website's critical consensus reads "With a title character as three-dimensional as its lush animation and a story that adds fresh depth to Disney's time-tested formula, Moana is truly a family-friendly adventure for the ages." Subsequently, the film is also listed as number 18 on the website's "100 Best Computer-Animated Movies" list. On Metacritic, the film holds a weighted average score of 81 out of 100, based on 44 critics, indicating "universal acclaim". Audiences polled by CinemaScore gave the film an average grade of "A" on a scale ranging from A+ to F, while PostTrak reported filmgoers gave an 89% overall positive score and a 79% "definite recommend".

Joe Morgenstern of The Wall Street Journal proclaimed that "Moana is beautiful in more ways than I can tell, thanks to the brilliance of more animators than I could count." Animator Eric Goldberg received praise from critics and audiences for his hand-drawn animation of Maui's tattoos, which they claimed "stole the show" from the actual CGI-animated motion picture. Wai Chee Dimock, writing in the Los Angeles Review of Books, compared the ocean in Moana to the one in "The Water Baby", a short story by Jack London, saying that both are animated: one, by the tension between digital and analog animation, and the other, by the tension between an encroaching future and a past in retreat still capable of pushing back.

Christy Lemire of RogerEbert.com gave the film three-and-a-half out of four stars, stating "...its dazzling visuals, catchy tunes, enjoyable performances, clever running gags and overall sense of fun. It's all there, and—except for a few scary moments—it'll delight viewers of all ages." Peter Debruge of Variety praised the film, calling it "a return to the heights of the Disney Renaissance".

Critics also lauded Moana for centering on a strong female protagonist whose narrative is not confined to finding a Prince Charming, a contrast to princess characters of past Disney films. Brent Lang of Variety wrote, "Whereas earlier Disney heroines waited around for their prince to come and save the day, Moana takes it upon herself to embark on a perilous oceanic voyage in order to lift her island home from a curse. It’s the kind of adventuring that would have been left for the guys in Disney films of yore...Her journey is about finding herself, not landing a husband".

Accolades

Legacy
Due to the success of the film, Moana was officially added to the Disney Princess franchise and was the 12th addition to the lineup. According to the official list of the most-watched streaming titles of 2021 released on January 21, 2022, by Deadline and Nielsen, Moana ranked as the second most streamed movie title of 2021 with 8.9 billion minutes watched, just behind Luca (2021), which had 10.5 billion watched.

Disney+ series 
On December 10, 2020, it was announced during the Disney investors meeting that a series based on the film would stream on Disney+ sometime in 2023. The release date was later pushed back to 2024. It is one of the first spin-offs to be produced by Walt Disney Animation Studios itself instead of its television animation division.

See also
 List of Walt Disney Animation Studios films
 House of Moana
 Māui (mythology)
 Māui (Hawaiian mythology)
 Polynesian narrative
 Polynesian navigation
 Polynesians
 Austronesian peoples

References

External links

 
2016 3D films
2016 computer-animated films
2010s adventure films
2010s American animated films
2010s fantasy adventure films
2010s musical fantasy films
American 3D films
American adventure comedy films
American animated fantasy films
American computer-animated films
American fantasy adventure films
American musical fantasy films
Animated coming-of-age films
American animated feature films
Animated teen films
Annie Award winners
Demons in film
2010s English-language films
Films scored by Mark Mancina
Films about shapeshifting
Films directed by John Musker
Films directed by Ron Clements
Films set in Polynesia
Films with screenplays by Chris Williams
Films with screenplays by Jared Bush
Films with screenplays by John Musker
Films with screenplays by Ron Clements
Sea adventure films
Seafaring films
Walt Disney Animation Studios films
Walt Disney Pictures animated films
3D animated films
Disney Princess films
Films based on mythology
2010s feminist films